Heather Bond Somers (born April 22, 1966) is an American politician who has served in the Connecticut State Senate from the 18th District since 2017. She previously served as Mayor of Groton from 2012 to 2014. She also served on the Groton Town Council from 2008 to 2018. Somers has a daughter named Grace, a son, Ian, and another daughter, Hayley. She is married to Mark Somers, a cardiologist at Lawrence & Memorial Hospital.

Electoral history

2020 
Heather Somers won re-election to a third term after defeating Democratic challenger Bob Statchen.

2018 
Heather Somers won re-election to a 2nd term after defeating Democratic challenger Robert Statchen.

References

1966 births
21st-century American politicians
21st-century American women politicians
Republican Party Connecticut state senators
Living people
People from Groton, Connecticut
University of Connecticut alumni
Women mayors of places in Connecticut
Women state legislators in Connecticut